Route 520, also known as North West River Road, is a  north-south supplementary highway off of the Trans-Labrador Highway in Labrador, which connects Happy Valley-Goose Bay to North West River.

Route 520 is the highest numbered highway of any kind in the entire province of Newfoundland and Labrador.

Route description

Route 520 begins at an intersection with Route 500 (Trans Labrador Highway) at the western edge of Happy Valley, with the road continuing into downtown as Hamilton River Road. It heads northwest through the Goose Bay portion of town to pass by Canadian Forces Base Goose Bay (and Goose Bay Airport), Nunatsiavut Marine Ferry terminal, and Goose (Otter Creek) Water Aerodrome, before crossing the Goose River to leave Happy Valley-Goose Bay and wind its way north along the outer reaches of Lake Melville. The highway passes northeast through rural wooded areas for several kilometres before passing through Sheshatshiu and crossing over the Naskaupi River into North West River, with Route 520 officially ending shortly thereafter at an intersection with Portage Road.

Major intersections

Attractions along Route 520

Lake Melville
Canadian Forces Base Goose Bay
Goose Bay Airport
Nunatsiavut Marine Ferry
Goose (Otter Creek) Water Aerodrome

See also

Trans-Labrador Highway
List of highways numbered 520

References

Labrador
520